Emblingia is a monospecific plant genus containing the species Emblingia calceoliflora, a herbaceous prostrate subshrub endemic to Western Australia. It has no close relatives, and is now generally placed alone in family Emblingiaceae.

Description
It is a perennial, herbaceous prostrate subshrub, with simple petiolate leaves with "cartilaginous" (hard and tough, resembling cartilage) margins. The irregular, solitary flowers are white, cream, yellow, green or, pink, and occur from August to November. It has a non-fleshy fruit.

Taxonomy
The genus and species were first published in 1861 by Ferdinand von Mueller in Fragmenta Phytographiae Australiae, based on specimens collected in the Murchison region by Pemberton Walcott and Augustus Frederick Oldfield.

Placement of the genus within a family has previously been considered a difficult problem; it has at various times been placed in Capparaceae, Sapindaceae, Goodeniaceae and, in the Cronquist system, Polygalaceae. In 1965, Herbert Kenneth Airy Shaw erected Emblingiaceae for the genus, and that family is now used for the genus in the APG II, Dahlgren, Reveal, Stevens, Takhtajan and Thorne systems. Molecular analyses have confirmed the genus's placement in the Brassicales.

Distribution and habitat
It is endemic to Western Australia, occurring in grey, yellow or red sand, on undulating sandplains of the west coast. It is most common in the Geraldton Sandplains and Carnarvon biogeographic regions, but also occurs on the north western edge of the Avon Wheatbelt.

Ecology
It is not considered to be threatened.

References

Further reading
 Mueller, Ferdinand von (1861) Fragmenta Phytographiae Australiae 2(15).
 Shaw, H. K. Airy (1965) Kew Bulletin 18:257.

External links

Rosids of Western Australia
Monotypic Brassicales genera
Brassicales
Taxa named by Ferdinand von Mueller
Endemic flora of Western Australia